Arnold Cass Lycett Wills (1906-1978) was an English cricketer active from 1926 to 1929 who played for Northamptonshire (Northants). He was born in Pimlico on 17 July 1906 and died in Northampton on 28 February 1978. He appeared in sixteen first-class matches as a righthanded batsman who bowled right arm medium pace. He scored 338 runs with a highest score of 68 and took six wickets with a best performance of three for 68.

Notes

1906 births
1978 deaths
English cricketers
Northamptonshire cricketers
Cambridge University cricketers